The Bitter Stems (Spanish language: Los Tallos Amargos) is a 1956 Argentine film noir directed by Fernando Ayala. The screenplay, written by Sergio Leonardo, was based on a novel by journalist Adolfo Jasca.

The film stars Carlos Cores as a journalist with an inferiority complex who partners with a Hungarian immigrant, played by Vassili Lambrinos, in a fraudulent get-rich-quick scheme that leads to crime and tragedy. Aída Luz, Julia Sandoval, and Pablo Moret also play major characters.

The film's cinematographer, Ricardo Younis, had not (as was widely rumored) studied under Gregg Toland, who shot Citizen Kane. American Cinematographer magazine named Los tallos amargos one of the “50 Best Photographed Films of All-Time”. Of note is a surreal dream sequence that merges noir photography with elements of German expressionism. The film was scored by Astor Piazzolla.

Los tallos amargos won Silver Condor awards for Best Picture and Best Director in 1957 but was considered lost until it turned up in a private collection in 2014. A 35mm version was subsequently restored by the UCLA Film & Television Archive, with funding provided by the Film Noir Foundation and Hollywood Foreign Press Association's Charitable Trust, and premiered in February 2016 at the Museum of Modern Art in New York. When the film played at the TCM Classic Film Festival in Hollywood later that year, the presenter noted that while the 35mm negative was rediscovered, the soundtrack remained lost, so the restoration used the track from the director's 16mm print.

Flicker Alley released a blu-ray edition in 2021.

In 2022, the film ranked 42nd in the list of The 100 Greatest Films of Argentine Cinema, a poll organized by the specialized magazines La vida útil, Taipei and La tierra quema, which was presented at the Mar del Plata International Film Festival.

References

External links

 The Bitter Stems at Letterboxd.com

Argentine crime drama films
1956 films
Films directed by Fernando Ayala
1950s Argentine films
1956 crime drama films
Argentine black-and-white films
Rediscovered Argentine films
1950s rediscovered films